United Nations Security Council Resolution 1667, adopted unanimously on March 31, 2006, after recalling all previous resolutions on the situations in Liberia and the subregion, particularly resolutions 1626 (2005) and 1638 (2005), the Council extended the mandate of the United Nations Mission in Liberia (UNMIL) until September 30, 2006.

Resolution

Observations
The Security Council recognised the important role that the Economic Community of West African States (ECOWAS) and African Union (AU) were playing in the Liberian process in addition to that of the international community. It welcomed the inauguration of Ellen Johnson Sirleaf as President of Liberia and the installation of a newly elected government, and acknowledged the existence of remaining challenges in the country.

Meanwhile, Council members welcomed the transfer of former President Charles Taylor to the Special Court for Sierra Leone.

Acts
Acting under Chapter VII of the United Nations Charter, the Council extended UNMIL's mandate and the temporary increase in its personnel size.  It reaffirmed its intention to authorise the Secretary-General Kofi Annan to redeploy troops between UNMIL and the United Nations Operation in Côte d'Ivoire (UNOCI) on a temporary basis in accordance with Resolution 1609 (2005). In this context, a review would take place of UNOCI's tasks and troop level with a decision on its possible reinforcement.

Finally, the Secretary-General was asked to present his plans regarding the drawdown of UNMIL to the Security Council.

See also
 List of United Nations Security Council Resolutions 1601 to 1700 (2005–2006)
 Second Liberian Civil War

References

External links
 
Text of the Resolution at undocs.org

 1667
 1667
 1667
2006 in Liberia
2006 in Sierra Leone
March 2006 events